Hemlock is a village in Saltlick Township, Perry County, Ohio, United States. The population was 142 at the 2020 census. The Village was originally settled as Coaldale on June 15, 1869 then established as Hemlock on July 15, 1872. A Post Office was in operation until the early 2000s.

History
Originally settled as Coaldale on June 15, 1869 then established Hemlock on July 15, 1872. The Hemlock post office was in operation till the early 2000s. The village was named for a grove of hemlock trees near the original town site.

Geography
Hemlock is located at  (39.591447, -82.156365).

Demographics

2010 census
As of the census of 2010, there were 155 people, 56 households, and 46 families living in the village. The racial makeup of the village was 100.0% White.

There were 56 households, of which 37.5% had children under the age of 18 living with them, 64.3% were married couples living together, 12.5% had a female householder with no husband present, 5.4% had a male householder with no wife present, and 17.9% were non-families. 17.9% of all households were made up of individuals, and 5.4% had someone living alone who was 65 years of age or older. The average household size was 2.77 and the average family size was 3.00.

The median age in the village was 39.4 years. 25.2% of residents were under the age of 18; 9.7% were between the ages of 18 and 24; 22.6% were from 25 to 44; 30.9% were from 45 to 64; and 11.6% were 65 years of age or older. The gender makeup of the village was 49.7% male and 50.3% female.

2000 census
As of the census of 2000, there were 142 people, 48 households, and 39 families living in the village. The population density was 374.2 people per square mile (144.3/km2). There were 58 housing units at an average density of 152.9 per square mile (58.9/km2). The racial makeup of the village was 95.07% White, 2.11% Asian, and 2.82% from two or more races. Hispanic or Latino of any race were 2.11% of the population.

There were 48 households, out of which 45.8% had children under the age of 18 living with them, 66.7% were married couples living together, 14.6% had a female householder with no husband present, and 16.7% were non-families. 16.7% of all households were made up of individuals, and 10.4% had someone living alone who was 65 years of age or older. The average household size was 2.96 and the average family size was 3.30.

In the village, the population was spread out, with 33.1% under the age of 18, 8.5% from 18 to 24, 33.1% from 25 to 44, 12.7% from 45 to 64, and 12.7% who were 65 years of age or older. The median age was 32 years. For every 100 females there were 94.5 males. For every 100 females age 18 and over, there were 82.7 males.

The median income for a household in the village was $26,250, and the median income for a family was $28,333. Males had a median income of $28,750 versus $17,917 for females. The per capita income for the village was $7,701. There were 26.3% of families and 24.3% of the population living below the poverty line, including 29.4% of under eighteens and 22.2% of those over 64.

References

Villages in Perry County, Ohio
Villages in Ohio
Coal towns in Ohio
1872 establishments in Ohio